Rose Akua Attaa Mensah (born 25 May 1963) is a Ghanaian actress who is best known as Kyeiwaa for her role in the Film Kyeiwaa.

Career 
Mensah started her career  as  a singer in the band African Brothers of which Nana Kwame Ampadu was the lead singer.  She then appeared in the Akan Drama TV series.  He was introduced by Nana Bosomprah to the Cantata TV Drama.

Filmography 

 Kyeiwaa 1,2,3,4,5
 Akurasi Burgers 1,2 & 3
 2016 1 & 2
 Ananse Spider-Man 1
 B14
 The Code of Money and Death
 Akonoba
 Cross Road
 Abebrese
 Ogyam

Achievement 

 Best Actress in a Leading Role (Local Language) - 2011
 She was a co-winner of the Best Actress Comedy.
 Favourite Actors Awards  - 2015

Personal life 
Kyeiwaa married Micheal Kissi Asare  in the United States Worcester, Massachusetts on Saturday, July 25, 2020

References

External links 

Living people
21st-century Ghanaian actresses
Ghanaian film actresses
1963 births